This is a list of damselflies (Odonata) of Canada.

Family Calopterygidae, broad-winged damsels

Genus Calopteryx, jewelwings

 Calopteryx aequabilis, river jewelwing
 Calopteryx amata, superb jewelwing
 Calopteryx dimidiata, sparkling jewelwing
 Calopteryx maculata, ebony jewelwing

Genus Hetaerina, rubyspots
 Hetaerina americana, American rubyspot

Family Lestidae, spreadwings

Genus Archilestes

 Archilestes grandis, great spreadwing

Genus Lestes

 Lestes australis, southern spreadwing
 Lestes congener, spotted spreadwing
 Lestes disjunctus, common spreadwing or northern spreadwing
 Lestes dryas, emerald spreadwing
 Lestes eurinus, amber-winged spreadwing
 Lestes forcipatus, sweetflag spreadwing
 Lestes inaequalis, elegant spreadwing
 Lestes rectangularis, slender spreadwing
 Lestes stultus, black spreadwing
 Lestes unguiculatus, lyre-tipped spreadwing
 Lestes vigilax, swamp spreadwing

Family Coenagrionidae, pond damsels

Genus Amphiagrion
 Amphiagrion abbreviatum, western red damsel
 Amphiagrion saucium, eastern red damsel

Genus Argia, dancers

 Argia alberta, Paiute dancer
 Argia apicalis, blue-fronted dancer
 Argia bipunctulata, seepage dancer
 Argia emma, Emma's dancer
 Argia fumipennis, variable dancer and violet dancer
 Argia moesta, powdered dancer
 Argia plana, springwater dancer
 Argia tibialis, blue-tipped dancer
 Argia translata, dusky dancer
 Argia vivida, vivid dancer

Genus Chromagrion
 Chromagrion conditum, aurora damsel

Genus Chrysobasis
 Chrysobasis lucifer, tail-light damsel

Genus Coenagrion, Eurasian bluets

 Coenagrion angulatum, prairie bluet
 Coenagrion interrogatum, Subarctic bluet
 Coenagrion resolutum, taiga bluet

Genus Enallagma, bluets

 Enallagma anna, river bluet
 Enallagma antennatum, rainbow bluet
 Enallagma aspersum, azure bluet
 Enallagma basidens, double-striped bluet
 Enallagma boreale, boreal bluet
 Enallagma carunculatum, tule bluet
 Enallagma civile, familiar bluet
 Enallagma clausum, alkali bluet
 Enallagma cyathigerum, northern bluet
 Enallagma daeckii, attenuated bluet
 Enallagma divagans, turquoise bluet
 Enallagma doubledayi, Atlantic bluet
 Enallagma durum, big bluet
 Enallagma ebrium, marsh bluet
 Enallagma exsulans, stream bluet
 Enallagma geminatum, skimming bluet
 Enallagma hageni, Hagen's bluet
 Enallagma laterale, New England bluet
 Enallagma minusculum, little bluet
 Enallagma pallidum, pale bluet
 Enallagma pictum, scarlet bluet
 Enallagma praevarum, arroyo bluet
 Enallagma recurvatum, pine barrens bluet
 Enallagma signatum, orange bluet
 Enallagma traviatum, slender bluet
 Enallagma vesperum, vesper bluet

Genus Ischnura, forktails

 Ischnura cervula, Pacific forktail
 Ischnura damula, plains forktail
 Ischnura hastata, citrine forktail
 Ischnura kellicotti, lilypad forktail
 Ischnura posita, fragile forktail
 Ischnura verticalis, eastern forktail

Genus Nehalennia, sprites

 Nehalennia gracilis, sphagnum sprite
 Nehalennia irene, sedge sprite

Genus Telebasis, firetails
 Telebasis byersi, duckweed firetail

See also
 List of butterflies of Canada
 List of moths of Canada
 List of dragonflies of Canada

References
 Dubois, Bob. Damselflies of the North Woods. Duluth, MN:Kollath+Stensaas, 2005.
 North American Dragonflies and Damselflies, Greg Lasley Nature Photography

Damselflies
Odonata of North America
Canada
Damselfies